Ledebouria ovatifolia, the flat-leaved African hyacinth (not to be confused with Ledebouria ovalifolia), is a widespread species of bulbous flowering plant in the family Asparagaceae, native to South Africa and Lesotho. With its highly variable spotted leaves and attractive flowers, it is popular with succulent enthusiasts, although it is not, strictly speaking, a succulent.

Subtaxa
The following subspecies are accepted:
Ledebouria ovatifolia subsp. ovatifolia
Ledebouria ovatifolia subsp. scabrida N.R.Crouch & T.J.Edwards – KwaZulu-Natal

References

ovatifolia
Flora of South Africa
Flora of Lesotho
Plants described in 1970